is a Japanese manga series written and illustrated by Yui Haga about Naoya, a man brought to a magical world as a candidate for the Princess Astarotte's harem. Lotte no Omocha! began its serialization run in the July 2007 issue of Dengeki Maoh and later republished in collected volumes by ASCII Media Works.

Plot

In order to maintain their body and preserve their beautiful appearance, Succubi who have undergone puberty must consume male essence, similar to how a vampire must consume blood. Initially a mere kiss will suffice, however as Succubi mature into young adults they eventually need to consume a liquid called "sáðfryma," better known as semen, to sustain themselves. The harems they form ensure a steady and safe supply of the liquid.

The princess, however, bears a great dislike against men, and only agrees to create a harem if a human male is to join, as humans are said to be extinct. However her followers are able to find a human male named Naoya Tohara who, along with his daughter Asuha, is brought to the monster realm to be part of Astarotte's harem.

Characters

Main characters

The protagonist of the series and a succubus. While only 10 years of age, Astarotte is told that she needs to begin building a harem because when she fully matures, her body will require a regular supply of semen to keep from wasting away, much like a vampire requires blood. Unfortunately, circumstances involving members of her mother's harem have led her to develop a fierce hatred and disgust toward all men. This is so extreme she moved out of the main palace to her current home and employed only females except for Olav, whom she allows because he's too old. She comes up with a plan to avoid the task entirely: she asks for a human male to be the first member of her harem, thinking it an impossible task as humans no longer exist in Álfheimr. Her chief adviser perseveres and travels to the human world via Yggdrasill, the World Tree which connects all worlds and which had been dormant for years. There she finds a suitable candidate and, much to Astarotte's chagrin, brings him to Álfheimr, along with his daughter. Initially dismissive of him, Astarotte eventually becomes fond of Naoya, even though she is often flustered by the situations they end up in. Occasionally she suffers from issues due to not developing yet due to being a late bloomer while her mother is very voluptuous. In the manga it is hinted that she might never develop as much as her mother due to a recessive gene from a female ancestor who still looked like an underdeveloped girl despite being several decades old with children. At the end of the anime she comes to realize that she actually loves him, while at the end of the manga, she and Naoya get married.

She initially has no idea that Naoya's daughter, and her best friend, Asuha, is actually her half-sister Asuhariet though she would later learn the truth which made her angry only because it was kept a secret from her while everyone else knew though she would later forgive them. Astarotte's father is mentioned to have died of an illness. Her mother, Mercelída Ygvar, lives and rules from the main palace.

The hero of the series. When the Yggdrasil tree activates and allows one of Lotte's servants to enter the human world, he is taken back to become the first member of Lotte's harem. Naoya encountered Lotte's mother roughly ten years previously when he was 12/13, and then again three years later when she brought Asuha, his daughter from said encounter, to live with him. Naoya generally resists any calls towards the harem antics that surround him, recognizing that at her age, and given her previous experiences, Astarotte needs emotional support more than she needs to be forced into male relationships. After Asuha grows her wings Naoya is forced to tell Lotte the truth about Asuha's parentage; that the two girls are, in fact, half-sisters. Judit believes that he may be part incubus, which may be the reason why the Yggdrasill tree's link to the human world activated upon reacting to him after being dormant for a long time. Apparently his parents eloped so he never met either side of his family, so after his parents died 3 years later he was alone in deep depression. He became happy again after he met his daughter after the funeral. At the end of the anime, when they were forced to part, he realizes his true feelings for Lotte, while at the end of the manga, he and Lotte get married.

 / 

Asuha is 10 years old, like Lotte. She is the child that came of the encounter between Naoya and then Princess Mercelída, when the latter fled Álfheimr for a time. She is, in actuality, the rumored "dead princess" Asuhariet, and as it turns out, Astarotte's older half-sister (they are the same age because succubus pregnancies are 4 months shorter than human pregnancies). The reason Mercelida gave her up to Naoya after 3 years (knowing she might never see her daughter again) is implied to be an attempt to prevent her daughters from being caught up in a conflict for the throne, in fear that such a conflict would only bring pain for both of them. She is energetic and outgoing, and quickly befriends Lotte and the other girls at school. As part of her cambion heritage, she has an aversion to wearing underwear, which becomes a running theme with her, much to her father's exasperation. This also add the irony to the fact that though not a full-blooded succubus, she acts like it far more than her half-sister. Being older, she is the first of Queen Mercelída's daughters to grow her wings.

In the anime adaptation, Asuha is aware of her cambion heritage and, after a chance encounter with her mother, the Queen, her half-sister relationship to Astarotte. However, as instructed by her father and Judit, she keeps the matter secret. In the manga she is aware that her mother is the Queen and, after her wings finally grow, she and Naoya tell Astarotte the truth of her heritage. Shocked and angry that it was kept a secret from her while everyone else knew the truth, Lotte ordered the two to leave though Asuha declared that she still loves Lotte regardless if she was hated but Lotte would forgive them the next day.

People of Ygvarland

Lotte Castle

Lotte's head of staff and lady-in-waiting. Judit is duly concerned about Lotte's strong dislike for men because it might also affect the Princess's future health. Because of this, she is overjoyed when Lotte demands a human male for her harem. Even though Lotte was disingenuous, Judit perseveres and brings Naoya to the demon world via the World Tree. As head of Lotte's staff, Naoya usually comes to Judit for advice or general information in the demon realm. She is also constantly reminding Naoya of the reason he has been hired and to "let her (Astarotte) suck out the life seed". It is heavily implied that Judit has exotic tastes in matters relating to sex and that she even keeps a room full of S&M paraphernalia. She was assigned as Lotte's lady-in-waiting by Mercelida 10 years ago when Lotte was just a year old. At the time, she was pregnant with a baby but did not know who the father was as she has had relationships with several men. Despite being prepared to give birth to her child, her family made her abandon this desire thus causing her to transfer her parental love to Lotte. As the years pass, however, Judit would come to love Lotte as a person and not just as a daughter figure.

Lotte's aging butler, who was her former head of staff before being replaced by Judit. Olav was the only male staff in Lotte's castle before Naoya came to serve Lotte in her harem. Lotte allows him to work at the castle as a sinecure (partly because he is like a grandfather to her but mainly because he's old enough to be a grandfather but refuses to admit it). This is shown when he becomes injured while doing something such as hurting his back while gardening and requiring immediate bed rest. He is as concerned about Lotte's dislike for men as Judit is. Olav acts like a very proud grandfather towards Lotte and becomes very emotional whenever Lotte tries to act mature.

Like all the other staff serving Lotte, she is concerned about Lotte's dislike for men, although she prefers sympathizing with the princess rather than reprimanding her. She usually acts as Lotte's confidante or adviser whenever Lotte is troubled. Griselda's subordinates often wear very revealing outfits, to her extreme embarrassment. In the manga, Griselda seems to harbor a grudge against Naoya from their first encounter but is implied to have developed a small crush on him (therefore acting as a tsundere, similar to Lotte), although her abuse of Naoya takes the form of slandering or badmouthing him in letters to her master. She is very insecure with her flat chest. Griselda is usually seen watching over the princess, Asuha, and Naoya together with Effie or Judit.
In Chapter 21 of the manga, Zelda likens the relationship between Naoya and Astarotte as one akin to that of "a father and a spoiled daughter", which is a far cry from their official roles as servant and mistress.

Nicknamed  for short, Elfreda is also part of Lotte's female-only staff. She's very notable for her very huge breasts, which made Naoya blush when he first met her. Effie is also one of Lotte's confidantes, the other one being Griselda. Effie hails from a noble bovine-like race and, as a female, she's able to produce as much milk as she desires even without having given birth. Her milk is of the highest quality and the only milk Lotte drinks. Effie is usually seen wearing a maid outfit, along with a bell around her neck (a nod to her bovine heritage) and is in charge of maintaining the castle's milk supply. Effie is generally nice, but can be slightly perverted at times, and was easily embarrassed around Naoya until she became used to his presence. Effie is usually seen together with Griselda or Judit, watching over the princess, Asuha, and Naoya. In Chapter 20 of the Manga, Effie stated that her older sister, Edda, was Mistrune's former wet-nurse.

She appears less frequently than the other servants, but she seems to be the only one in the castle who usually acts normally. She comes from the same country of night elves as Prince Sigurd. She came into Lotte's employ when a slave merchant tried to sell her to the princess, not realizing that the noble in the carriage was actually Lotte, who was very upset that her country's anti-slave law was being violated. Cu was a slave because the Alfur (High Elf) and Nott Alfur (Night Elf) races abhor the existence of half-breed children between the two even more than members of the other race (with a few notable exceptions – see below). Cu's skin color being intermediate between Alfur and Nott Alfur is evidence of her mixed parentage. After being rescued Cu decided to stay and work for Lotte because the princess and the castle staff valued her for herself and didn't care about her parentage.

She is hired as one of the castle's maids in an attempt to help Prince Sigurd in sabotaging Lotte's relationship with Naoya. Like Cu, she is the daughter of an Alfur and a Nott Alfur, although this is evident as patchwork of lighter and darker skin in the form of a 'swimsuit tanline' rather than intermediate coloration like Cu's. It is later revealed that she is Nott Alfur King Sveinn's illegitimate daughter, whom Helga and Sigurd are not only aware of, but openly treat as their little sister. Part of the reason Criet wants a job is to be self-reliant rather than living solely on her allowance after her mother died one year prior. After her mixed parentage is revealed, she finds out that Judit and Lotte already knew about her parentage (including being Sveinn's daughter) when they hired her, but didn't have a problem with it. She decides to continue working at the castle as she feels it's "warm" (Naoya saying that her skin looked beautiful didn't hurt either). As such she no longer hides her mixed parentage and seems to have taken up teasing Naoya occasionally. How Helga and Sigurd's mother feels about her is unknown. However, Criet has painful memories of traveling with her mother while hiding her mixed parentage and that, while her siblings and father accepted her, her hometown didn't.

She is a character exclusive to the manga and does not appear in the anime.

Ivory Tower

Nicknamed  by Asuha, Ingrid is the most intelligent being in the Monster Realm even though she is only 7 years old. Her father, the world-renowned 300-year-old sage, died five years prior to the story. In the manga she explains that her father performed a memory transfer when she was younger, giving her all of his accumulated knowledge. As such, she knows almost everything since she is always reading books and discovering new things. However, she has lived a very secluded life, and her common sense and social skills tend to be lacking.
She is introduced when Naoya and Asuha travel to her tower in search of help to return Lotte to the Monster Realm. Her tower has a rabbit door hanger and a mail slot and in order to obtain access to her a supplicant has to supply an answer that solves a provided riddle. Asuha managed to "solve" the riddle by answering in such a non-standard way that it got Ini's attention.
She later appears to have developed a crush on Naoya, as shown when she kisses him in chapter 9. After she moves her tower closer to Lotte's castle, Ini introduces herself as his lover much to his confusion and Lotte's annoyance.

The former Great Sage of the Ivory Tower and Ingrid's father who died five years ago. He had collected almost all of the knowledge in the world, and he transferred this knowledge to his young daughter before his apparent death. He was known to be 300 years old, and was the one whom Naoya and Asuha initially searched for.

Rinhird Castle

The mother of Lotte and Asuha who is a buxom woman. Mercelída is extremely promiscuous, even for a succubus; she started consuming male essence at age 10, and her harem contains over 3000 men of various races that also acts as her own private army. She has bisexual tendencies as well, such as when she and Ursula intimately flirt and nearly kiss at the beach. She once slept with a man from her harem while Lotte (who was 5 at the time) was in bed with her, having forgotten that Lotte was asleep nearby. This is slightly changed in the anime, so that instead of the man coming uncalled when Lotte was already in bed with her mother, he came when Astarotte was heading to her mother's room, so that her mother did not know she was there. Either way, the shock of this experience was the origin of Astarotte's hatred toward men. Because of her constantly busy schedule, she has little to no time to spend with Astarotte causing her to label herself as a bad mother. Despite this, she learns that she is very much loved by her daughters and thus she tries her best to make time for them especially now that Asuha has returned.

It is shown in flashbacks that Mercelída did not wish to become Queen, but was forced to ascend to the throne when her two elder sisters poisoned one another. At age 18, she traveled to the human world to avoid her responsibilities but discovered that the human realm (and humanity as a whole) is fairly mana-poor, leaving her without a source of life energy and no way to return home. Fortunately she met a 12-year-old Naoya, who even then possessed an overwhelming amount of magical power, which she was able to consume while using magic to make him sleep through the entire event. Unfortunately, in her haste she did not set up a contraception spell, and she became pregnant with Asuhariet. 3 years later she brought Asuha to live with Naoya on Earth in order to avoid her two daughters from engaging in a similar conflict. When she learns that Naoya is living in the Monster Realm, it is revealed that she still has feelings for him and affectionately calls him "Darling". She would also attempt to seduce him whenever they meet but is often rebuffed.

Mercelida's friend and bodyguard. In the manga and anime, it is implied that she has feelings for the Queen. In the manga, during the beach chapter, she is seen naked by Sigvaldi and revealed to be a hermaphrodite. This revelation never happens in the anime, which has a slightly different history, and thus may not be canon in the anime. In the anime, however, it is implied that Ursula already managed to subtly reveal her feelings to Mercelida (who eagerly reciprocates them) when Mercelida confides to Ursula about how Mercelida's personal romantic life is stuck in a rut despite the existence of Mercelida's harem, as the two share an almost-kiss before they are suddenly interrupted. Ursula is from the Varhund (were-dog) race.

A manga-only character, Kilik is a Colonel in the military. However he is weak, cowardly and woefully incompetent (something which he completely acknowledges). He got to his current rank by sleeping with his female superior officers and the wives of the male ones. But this practice has gotten him as far as he can go and he attempted to step up higher by seducing Lotte, which failed miserably due to her hatred of men. He could easily live a life of luxury if he joined the queen's harem, but he desires authority much more than wealth (due to being born a peasant rather than a noble). Despite his raunchy lifestyle he has been characterized as having a small penis, at least in comparison to Naoya and Ursula.

Eldor is Kilik's first lieutenant. Despite being actually competent in his job and embarrassed by his superior's nature, he seems to have no problem with aiding Kilik in his schemes or serving out punishments with him when they fail (though he does try to be a voice of reason to Kilik). Ursula is Eldor's older cousin and he refers to her as "sis," implying a relatively close relationship.

Royal Academy

Erika is the daughter of a baron and hails from the high noble race of vampires. She is one of Lotte's and Asuha's friends, although Eríka and Lotte are more akin to rivals, where as she and Asuha often look after Lotte or scheme together. During the Ygvarland festivities, she joins Lotte and Asuha's friends in cheering on Lotte and Asuha's performance. Although Eríka is very proud of her vampire lineage, she also truly cares for her friends, even though she vehemently denies this. In this she is similar to Lotte in that both of them have tsundere tendencies, although, since Eríka is older, they are not as pronounced. As a maturing vampire, Eríka will soon need to start consuming blood on a regular basis in order to sustain herself, although the manga claims that she can still resort to drinking tomato juice for a while longer. 
For unknown reasons, Eríka gets extremely jealous and frustrated when she hears that Astarotte and Naoya going out on a date or furthering their relationship.

Místrúne, nicknamed  for short, is one of Lotte and Asuha's friends. She is the daughter of a viscount and notable for having the biggest bust among Lotte's group of friends, including Eríka. Místrúne and her friends were initially reluctant to approach Lotte due to her royal status, but, through Asuha's intervention, became friends with Lotte at last. At fourteen years-old, Mist is the oldest of her group of friends, and her maturing figure earns her the jealousy of the other girls. The other girls are under the misapprehension that Mist's large bust is due to her having been nursed by Edda, Effie's older sister. Místrúne is also the most perverted one among the girls, although she usually manages to keep this side of hers hidden. She once had a crush on Naoya after he visited the girls' school.

Unnbjörg, nicknamed  for short, is one of Lotte and Asuha's friends. She has short green hair and a tall, slim figure. Unnbjörg is generally the most level-headed one of Lotte's friends, although she tends to go berserk whenever someone comments on her flat chest. She was the first to incorrectly believe that drinking directly from a dairy fairy's chest after a bath will make one's chest grow bigger. It has been hinted that Yuna is of the race of noble elves.
Yuna is also the subject of an artistic inconsistency between the manga and the anime; she sports navy blue hair in the former, while her anime counterpart is depicted with green hair.

Lucca is one of Lotte and Asuha's friends. She is a young princess from Northern Dvergur Kingdom (Northern Dwarf Kingdom). Her notable features include a small figure (even smaller than Asuha and Lotte) and brown hair with matching thick eyebrows. It is possible that Lucca comes from a wild tribe since she has admitted that she never wore panties before she came to Ygvarland. She also tends to always believe most of Asuha's white lies (For example, Asuha said that when wearing yukatas, one should not wear panties and when Eríka passes by, Lucca flips up Eríka's skirt, to Naoya's chagrin and Asuha's feigned ignorance). Unnborg has mentioned that Lucca stays over at her mansion. Lucca hails from a noble race of Dvergur (which explains her small figure and unconventional dining mannerisms), and that Yuna's mother enjoys dressing her up in frilly outfits as a "pastime".

Enja is the school's principal who looks as young as when Mercelida was her student. This is due to her being a Vartófa (were-fox) as heir species adolescence lasts 30 years.

People of Svarthæð
The people of Svarthæð are Nótt Álfur (night-elves) who originally also came from another world, Svartálfheimr, which was linked in the past with Álfheimr.

 Sveinn Svarthæð is the king of the country of Svarthæð and father of Rúrik, Helga, Sigurð and Criet.

Rúrik is the first prince of Svarthæð and seems to have been kept on a short leash due to his hobbies which seem to be even more offensive than Sigurð's attitude and partying. His relationship with Criet is unknown but during a party, he is shown to be sexually molesting his sister Helga before Naoya 'accidentally' fires a champagne cork in his direction interrupting his fun. In the manga his personality comes across as a pervert with a sadistic streak.

Þorhelga, nicknamed Helga for short, is the princess of Svarthæð and is Sigurð's worrisome older sister. Like Sigurð she knows how to fight and defend herself, but unlike him takes herself and her responsibilities more seriously. She spends much of her time keeping him from causing too much trouble. She developed a huge crush on Naoya after he saved her from Rúrik's molestation at a party without making a big scene or creating an incident. Her feelings were further inflamed when she saw how strongly he held to his ideals even when tested, so much so that Criet was shocked upon seeing her behaving like a love sick teenager before composing herself. Helga becomes very depressed when she finds out that he has a daughter.

Sigurð is the second prince of Svarthæð. Prior to his transfer to Lotte's academy, Sigurð spent his time and money on drinking and girls. He first meets Lotte at a street corner, falling in love with her at first sight, but Asuha immediately disapproves of him. He is often regarded as a wolf due to his mannerisms. The school put up warning signs of "Pervert" with his face on them at the girls' side, courtesy of Dóra, one of Sigurð's worrisome bodyguards. When Sigurð does sneak over to the girls' side, he meets Asuha again, who calls him a pervert. When Sigurð discovers Naoya is part of Lotte's harem, he immediately declares himself to be Naoya's rival for Lotte's hand. Aside from his perverted tendencies, Sigurð is a famous and well-respected general in battle. Ironically, although he was trained in a strict military academy, Sigurð continues to act by his own rules and uses the skills he learned at the military mostly for stalking Lotte's group or escaping Dóra's oversight. Despite all this, he is a surprisingly good cook as he was constantly told that quickly replenishing one's body is important to victory. In the manga Helga puts a special ring on him that Dóra can activate if she feels he is getting too wild and needs to be reigned in.

Ísadóra, nicknamed Dóra for short, is a chamberlain working under Sigurð. She is distantly related to Sigurð and Helga and is under orders from Helga to monitor and restrain Sigurð as needed based on her own judgement. If she feels it necessary she can chant an incantation that activates a ring Sigurð is wearing to forcibly restrain him. She is about Lotte's height but, based on her level of maturity in reigning in Sigurð's antics, is likely a few years older. She always wears an eyepatch, as it's a present from Sigurð which she treasures.

Media

Manga
The original manga by Yui Haga was serialized in Dengeki Maoh magazine from July 2007 to December 2013.

Video games
Lotte appears in Disgaea 4: A Promise Unforgotten as the cameo character for the spell, Omega Ice.

Anime
An anime adaptation under the title  began airing on Chiba TV and tvk on April 10, 2011, with subsequent broadcasts on Sun Television, TV Saitama, Tokyo MX, KBS Kyoto, TV Aichi, Nico Nico Channel, Bandai Channel, and AT-X. Produced by Diomedéa, the series is directed by Fumitoshi Oizaki, series composition by Deko Akao, music by Twinpower, character design by Mai Otsuka, and produced by Gorō Shinjuku, Jun Fukuda, Naoki Iijima, Takashi Kikuya and Tatsuya Ishiguro, respectively. An OVA episode was released on August 26, 2011.

The anime adaption altered the sequence of some of the events as compared to the manga, for example, among others, moving the theme park visit later and introducing Lotte's classmates far earlier in the storyline, as well as adding a subplot about Lotte gaining a magical tattoo on her back revealing she is about to undergo puberty.  This subplot was later retconned into the manga.

Episode list

Notes

References

External links
 Lotte no Omocha! at Dengeki Comics
 Astarotte no Omocha! official anime website
 
 

2007 manga
2011 Japanese television series debuts
2011 Japanese television series endings
Anime series based on manga
ASCII Media Works manga
Comedy anime and manga
Dengeki Comics
Diomedéa
Succubi in popular culture
Harem anime and manga
Kadokawa Dwango franchises
Seinen manga
Norse mythology in anime and manga